Joshua Wilder Tasker (June 25, 1887 – March 14, 1974) was an American football, basketball, and baseball coach. He served as the head football coach at Connecticut Agricultural College—now known as the University of Connecticut—from 1921 to 1922, the College of William & Mary from 1923 to 1927, and Rutgers University from 1931 to 1937, compiling a career college football record of 67–52–11. Wilder was also the head basketball coach at Connecticut from 1921 to 1923 and  William & Mary from 1923 to 1928, tallying a career college basketball mark of 66–49. In addition he served as the head baseball coach at Connecticut (1922–1923), William & Mary (1924–1928), and Rutgers (1932–1937), amassing a career college baseball record of 88–108–4.

Coaching career
Tasker became athletic coach at Connecticut Agricultural College—now known as the University of Connecticut—in 1921. He resigned as coach at Connecticut in January 1923. Connecticut's athletic director, Roy J. Guyer, took over coaching of the Connecticut Aggies men's basketball team.

In March 1923, Tasker was hired at athletic director and coach at the College of William & Mary in Williamsburg, Virginia.

Later life and death
After leaving from coaching, Tasker ran an insurance business in Orange, New Jersey. He retired in the 1960s and moved to Kilmarnock, Virginia, where he died at his home, on March 14, 1974.

Head coaching record

Football

Basketball

Baseball
The following table depicts Tasker's record as head baseball coach at Connecticut.

Notes

References

External links
 

1887 births
1974 deaths
Rutgers Scarlet Knights baseball coaches
Rutgers Scarlet Knights football coaches
Syracuse Orangemen baseball players
Syracuse Orange football players
UConn Huskies baseball coaches
UConn Huskies football coaches
UConn Huskies men's basketball coaches
Union Dutchmen baseball players
Union Dutchmen football players
William & Mary Tribe athletic directors
William & Mary Tribe baseball coaches
William & Mary Tribe football coaches
William & Mary Tribe men's basketball coaches
High school baseball coaches in the United States
High school basketball coaches in New York (state)
High school football coaches in New York (state)
People from Richmond, Maine
Basketball coaches from Maine